Hangar 15 Bicycles is an American UCI Continental cycling team founded in 1994. It gained UCI Continental status in 2017.

Team roster

Major wins
2017
Stage 1 Grand Prix Cycliste de Saguenay, Steve Fisher

References

UCI Continental Teams (America)
Cycling teams established in 1994
Cycling teams based in the United States